Betina "Beti" Temelkova (born 26 February 1997) is a Bulgarian-Israeli female judoka.

Since 2017, Bulgarian-born Temelkova is competing for Israel, where she resides with her Israeli husband and fellow judoka Baruch Shmailov, although she received her full Israeli citizenship only in 2019.

That year, she won the gold medal at the 2017 Tashkent Grand Prix.

References

External links
 
 

1997 births
Living people
Israeli female judoka
Bulgarian female judoka
Judoka at the 2014 Summer Youth Olympics
Bulgarian emigrants to Israel